Comodon is an extinct genus of Late Jurassic mammal from the Morrison Formation of Wyoming. Fossils of this taxon are present in stratigraphic zone 5.

Systematics
Comodon was originally named Phascolodon by Simpson (1925) for USNM 2703, a mandible from Quarry  9 in Como Bluff, Wyoming. However, the name Phascolodon was already in use for a ciliophore described in 1859, and the replacement name Comodon ("tooth from Como Bluff") was erected by Kretzoi & Kretzoi (2000). Meanwhile, Cifelli & Dykes (2001) coined the replacement name Phascolotheridium for Phascolodon, unaware of the paper by Kretzoi and Kretzoi (2000).

See also

 Prehistoric mammal
 List of prehistoric mammals
 Paleobiota of the Morrison Formation

References

 Foster, J. (2007). Jurassic West: The Dinosaurs of the Morrison Formation and Their World. Indiana University Press. 389pp.

Morrison mammals
Fossil taxa described in 2000
Taxa named by Miklós Kretzoi
Prehistoric mammal genera